This is a list of museums in Mongolia.

Baruun-Urt 
 General Museum of Sukhbaatar Province

Bayankhongor 
 Historical-ethnographical and Natural History Museum of Bayankhongor province

Choibalsan 
 Museum of Dornod Province

Khovd 
 Khovd Province museum

Kharkhorin 
 Kharakhorum museum 
 Khushuu Tsaidam Museum

Öndörkhaan 
 Setsenkhaan Palace  and Khentii Province museum

Sainshand 
 Danzanravjaa Museum
 Sainshand Natural History Museum

Sükhbaatar 
 General Museum of Selenge Province

Tsetserleg 
 Arkhangai province  museum

Ulaanbaatar 
 Central Museum of Dinosaurs of Mongolia
 Choijin Lama Temple Museum
 Hunting and Game Museum
 International Intellectual Museum
 Marshal Jukov House Museum
 Memorial Museum for Victims of Political Repression
 Mongol Costumes Museum 
 Mongolian Theatre Museum
 Museum of Traditional Medicine 
 Mongolian Natural History Museum
 Mongolian Military Museum
 Mongolia Museum of Art
 Mongolian National Modern Art Gallery  
 National Museum of Mongolia
 Winter Palace Museum of Bogd Khan
 The Fine Arts Zanabazar Museum

Ulaangom 
 Uvs aimag museum

Khalkhgol 

 Khalkhgol Victory Museum

See also
List of museums
Tourism in Mongolia
Culture of Mongolia

References

Museums
 
Mongolia
Museums
Museums
Mongolia